Women's Overall World Cup 1988/1989

In Women's Overall World Cup 1988/89 all results count. The parallel slalom did not count for the Overall World Cup.

References

World Cup
FIS Alpine Ski World Cup overall titles